The Heteractinids are a grade of sponges that are paraphyletic with respect to Hexactinellida.  Their distinctive trait is their six-pronged (snowflake-like) spicules, whose  symmetry  historically suggested a relationship with the triradial Calcarean sponges.  Nevertheless, they actually represent a polyphyletic grade, from which the hexactinellids arose.

Families
The following families are placed in Heteractinida:
 †Astraeospongiidae Miller, 1889
 †Eiffeliidae Rigby, 1986
 †Nuchidae Pickett, 2002
 †Wewokellidae King, 1943

References

Hexactinellida